Below is a list of prime ministers of the Netherlands Antilles from 1951 to 2010. In 2010 the position of Prime Minister of the Netherlands Antilles was abolished, together with the dissolution of the country itself.

List of prime ministers of the Netherlands Antilles 
Political parties:

 Christian democratic
 PNP
 Social democratic
 MAN FOL

Liberal

PAR

Notes

See also 
 Governor of the Netherlands Antilles
 Prime Minister of the West Indies Federation (British West Indies)

References

External links 
 World Statesmen – Curaçao (Netherlands Antilles)

 
Government of the Netherlands Antilles
Prime Ministers